South African jurisprudence refers to the study and theory of South African law. Jurisprudence has been defined as "the study of general theoretical questions about the nature of laws and legal systems."

See also 
 Jurisprudence
 South African law

References

Books 
 Dias, RWM. Jurisprudence. 5th edition. Butterworths, 1985.
 Freeman MDA. Lloyd's Introduction to Jurisprudence. 7th edition. Sweet and Maxwell, 2001.
 Harris JW. Legal Philosophies. 2nd edition. Butterworths, 1997.
 Johnson, David, Steve Pete, and Max du Plessis. Jurisprudence: A South African Perspective. LexisNexis, 2008.
 McCoubrey H. and White N. Textbook on Jurisprudence. 4th edition. Blackstone Press, 2003.
 Riddal JG. Jurisprudence. 2nd edition. Butterworths, 1999.
 Roederer C. and Moellendorf D. Jurisprudence. Juta & Co., 2004.
 Van Blerk A. Jurisprudence: An Introduction. Butterworths, 1996.

Case law 
 Incorporated Law Society v Wookey 1912 AD 623.
 Jilani v The Government of Punjab PLD 1972 SC 670.
 Madzimbamuto v Lardner-Burke, NO and Another, NO; Baron v Ayre, NO and Others, NNO 1968 (2) SA 284 (RA).
 Marbury v Madison 5 U.S. 137 (1803).
 Matiso and Others v The Commanding Officer, Port Elizabeth Prison and Others 1994 (3) BCLR 80 (SE).
 Mitchell v Director of Public Prosecutions 1986 AC 73.
 Nyamakazi v President of Bophuthatswana 1992 (4) SA 540 (BG).
 Qozeleni v Minister of Law and Order and Another 1994 (3) SA 625 (E).
 R v Big M Drug Mart Ltd [1985] 18 DLR (4d) 321.
 Riggs v Palmer 115 NY 506, 22NE 188 (1889).
 S v Makwanyane 1995 (3) SA 391 (CC).
 S v Mhlungu and Others 1995 (3) SA 867 (CC).
 S v Zuma 1995 (2) SA 642 (CC).
 Government of the Republic of South Africa and Others v Grootboom and Others 2001 (1) SA 46 (CC).
 The State v Dosso PLD 1958 SC 180, 553.
 Uganda v Commissioner of Prisons, ex parte Matovu [1966] EA 514.

Legislation 
 Bophuthatswana Internal Security Act 32 of 1979.
 Employment Equity Act 55 of 1998.
 Immorality Act 23 of 1957.
 Natives Land Act, 1913.
 Prevention of Family Violence Act 133 of 1993.
 Recognition of Customary Marriages Act 120 of 1998.
 South Africa Act 1909.
 Stamp Act 1765.
 Sugar Act 1763.

Notes 

Law of South Africa
Jurisprudence